David Morgan may refer to:

Academics
 David Watcyn Morgan (1859–1940), Dean of St David's, 1931–1940
 David Owen Morgan (1893–1959), British zoologist
 David Morgan (sociologist) (1937–2020), British sociologist
 David O. Morgan (1945–2019), professor of history at the University of Wisconsin–Madison
 David Morgan (art historian), professor of religious studies
 David M. Morgan, Chancellor of Deakin University
 David R. Morgan, professor of political science at the University of Oklahoma
 David Morgan, otherwise Dewi Morgan (1877–1971), Welsh bard, scholar and journalist

Politics
 David Morgan (Jacobite) (1690s–1746), Welsh lawyer involved in the Jacobite rising of 1745
 David Morgan (trade unionist) (1840–1900), Welsh miners' agent and trade unionist
 David Morgan (judge) (1849–1912), United States judge who served as Chief Justice of North Dakota
 David Watts Morgan (1867–1933), Welsh trade unionist and Member of Parliament
 David Eirwyn Morgan (1918–1982), Welsh minister, trade unionist and politician
 David John Morgan (1844–1917), British Member of Parliament for Walthamstow, 1900–1906

Sports
 David Morgan (rugby union) (1872–1933), Welsh international rugby player
 David Morgan (cricket administrator) (born 1937), Welsh
 David Morgan II (born 1993), American football tight end
 David Morgan (footballer) (born 1994), footballer
 David Morgan (swimmer) (born 1994), Australian swimmer
 David Lee Morgan Jr. (born 1965), American sportswriter

Other
 David Morgan (frontiersman) (1721–1813), American frontiersman
 David Morgan (composer) (1933–1988), British composer
 David Morgan (engineer) (born 1942), British engineer who claims to have invented the traffic cone
 David Morgan (businessman) (born 1947), Australian businessman
 David Morgan (Royal Navy officer) (born 1947), British fighter pilot
 David Morgan (journalist) (1959–2016), Northern Irish television presenter and journalist
 David Morgan (comedian), British stand-up comedian
 David Morgan (department store), a department store in Cardiff, Wales
 David Morgan (psychoanalyst), British psychoanalyst
 David Bannister Morgan (1772–1845), U.S. adjutant general at the Battle of New Orleans
 David Morgan, British musician, member of Lovestation

See also
Dave Morgan (disambiguation)
David Hughes-Morgan (1871–1941), Welsh solicitor and landowner

Morgan, David